Interstate 90 (I-90) in the US state of South Dakota traverses east–west through the southern half of the state.

Route description
I-90 enters South Dakota in Lawrence County as a four-lane divided highway. It enters concurrently with US Highway 14 (US 14) and passes through the town of Spearfish, where it shares another concurrency with US 85 from exit 10 to exit 17. From there it passes several miles north and east of the tourist town of Deadwood before entering Meade County, going just to the west of Sturgis. Another concurrency is with South Dakota Highway 34 (SD 34) from exit 23 at Whitewood to exit 30, the west exit of Sturgis, where there starts a concurrency with SD 79. The freeway generally passes along the north and east edges of the Black Hills.

The route then enters Pennington County, where it passes through the northern edge of Rapid City, gateway to the Black Hills and the nearest passing to Mount Rushmore National Memorial, as well as other scenic attractions including Custer State Park and the Needles Highway. Rapid City is also where the interstate has its westernmost auxiliary route, I-190, which links the Interstate to the western edge of the downtown area. SD 79's concurrency ends at exit 61 on the east side of the city. From Rapid City, the route heads east, passing between Box Elder to the south and Ellsworth Air Force Base to the north before heading toward Wall on to Jackson County. Exits 110 and 131 for Badlands National Park to the south (SD 240) are within  either way of the county line. The concurrency for US 14 ends at exit 112 just east of Wall; here, US 14 runs due east and will connect to the city of Philip and the capital city of Pierre.

 From there, the route passes mostly east–west through Jackson and Jones counties. There are short concurrencies with SD 73 (from the west entering Kadoka) and SD 63 in Jackson County. I-90 crosses the Central–Mountain timezone boundary on the west edge of Jones County between milemarkers 174 and 175. Then, at Murdo, a concurrency begins with US 83 at exit 192 and continues to exit 212. The road crosses the Missouri River at Lake Francis Case, between the towns of Oacoma and Chamberlain, also crossing into Brule County. I-90 Business (I-90 Bus.) runs from exit 260 at Oacoma to downtown Chamberlain across the Missouri River on the nearby Chamberlain Bridge and returns to I-90 at exit 265. Beginning there is a short concurrency with SD 50 heading to Pukwana, and also in Brule County is another short concurrency with SD 45 starting at Kimball.

I-90 then continues through Aurora County (connecting to White Lake and Plankinton), Davison County (where Mt. Vernon, Mitchell, and the Corn Palace are located), Hanson County (Alexandria), and McCook County (Salem). Then comes the state's most populous county, Minnehaha. After passing the communities of Humboldt and Hartford, the Interstate intersects the only other major Interstate in the state, I-29, at Sioux Falls, the largest city. Just east of I-29 is where I-90 meets the northern terminus of I-229. East of Brandon and northeast of Valley Springs, it then ends its trip through South Dakota of  before entering Minnesota and Rock County, just west of the towns of Beaver Creek and Manley.

The speed limit remains  between Rapid City and the Wyoming state line.

Codified law
The South Dakota section of I-90 is defined at South Dakota Codified Laws § 31-4-184.

History

I-90 was constructed in the 1970s. The four-lane Interstate replaced old US 16 as the main road connecting Rapid City and Sioux Falls. Much of Old US 16 remains intact; however, I-90 has absorbed sections and likewise has reshaped the economies of many southern South Dakota towns. The final section of I-90 in the state opened in November 1976 between the Wyoming state line and Spearfish.

On May 24, 2012, the South Dakota Transportation Commission declared the entire length of I-90 as part of the National Purple Heart Trail, naming it the Purple Heart Memorial Highway, named after the military decoration of the same name.

Removal of exit 66
In the city of Box Elder, exit 66, which crossed SD 435, was closed on October 1, 2003, after a 10-month delay. The exit was closed and removed as a result of the South Dakota Department of Transportation (SDDOT)'s efforts to move traffic away from a potential crash site at the end of the Ellsworth AFB runway. The partial cloverleaf interchange of exit 66 was also demolished shortly thereafter. Exit 67, which was constructed not too long before the closure of exit 66, is now used as the main entrance and exit feeder to the base, and it is less likely to be impacted by a potential crash.  Local citizens and officials feared the lack of entrances which access the Ellsworth AFB would cause traffic issues and moving businesses from near the old exit would cause some to close and affect tax revenue. Land near exit 66 began to be purchased in 2004, including the former McDonald's property.

Exit list

References

External links

90
 South Dakota
Transportation in Sioux Falls, South Dakota
Transportation in Lawrence County, South Dakota
Transportation in Meade County, South Dakota
Transportation in Pennington County, South Dakota
Transportation in Rapid City, South Dakota
Transportation in Jackson County, South Dakota
Transportation in Jones County, South Dakota
Transportation in Lyman County, South Dakota
Transportation in Brule County, South Dakota
Transportation in Aurora County, South Dakota
Transportation in Davison County, South Dakota
Transportation in Hanson County, South Dakota
Transportation in McCook County, South Dakota
Transportation in Minnehaha County, South Dakota